An incomplete list of events in Rome, Italy.

April
 Roma Sana - Mediterranean Trade Fair for Natural Products with exhibitions of biological products, conferences and tasting.

June
 Republic Day - Military parade celebrating the formation of the republic on the second day of June.  Takes place on the road Via dei Fori Imperiali, with the "Frecce Tricolori" of the Italian Air Force.

Summer (June to September)
 Roman Summers - Various events from music to theater, literary meetings and cinema. Events that take place in the most characteristic places in Rome that attract the participation of thousands of artists from all over the world.

September
Romaeuropa Festival - Annual appointment for modern art and theatre, music and dance, with artists from all of Europe.

October
 Rome Film Festival - film festival 
 Festival Romics - Comics and Cartoon Festival: exhibitions, cartoon film showings of designers and publishing companies. 
 Rome Jazz Festival - Festival of jazz music since of 1876 with Italian and international artists.

White Night

Series of events at venues throughout Rome in September: concerts, special outdoor performances, churches and monuments open to the public at this time, museums open all night with free entrance, shops open all night. See Nuit Blanche .

External links
 Events

Annual events in Italy
Rome